Terminalia oblongata, commonly known as yellow-wood or rosewood, is a species of plant in the Combretaceae family. It is native to Australia.

References

oblongata
Flora of Queensland
Myrtales of Australia
Taxa named by Ferdinand von Mueller